John Taylor (23 December 1857 – 19 September 1936) was the member of parliament (MP) for Dumbarton Burghs elected at the 1918 general election, when he narrowly defeated David Kirkwood.

He is usually regarded as a Liberal, although his candidacy was jointly organised by the National Democratic and Labour Party. In the House of Commons, he was a supporter of David Lloyd George's coalition government.

He lost the seat to Kirkwood in 1922, when he stood as a National Liberal, and he did not stand again.

References

External links 
 

1857 births
1936 deaths
Members of the Parliament of the United Kingdom for Scottish constituencies
People associated with West Dunbartonshire
Scottish Liberal Party MPs
UK MPs 1918–1922
National Liberal Party (UK, 1922) politicians